Luteipulveratus mongoliensis is a bacterium from the genus of Luteipulveratus which has been isolated from soil from the Mongolia.

References

External links
Type strain of Luteipulveratus mongoliensis at BacDive -  the Bacterial Diversity Metadatabase

Micrococcales
Bacteria described in 2010